Rosularia aizoon is a succulent that forms rosettes of hairy, pale green to blue-green leaves. It is hardy down to zone 7a (-17 °C, 0 °F) and blooms in summer. The plant was first described as Prometheun aizoon by Eduard Fenzl then transferred to genus Rosularia by Alwin Berger in 1930.

References

Crassulaceae
Plants described in 1930
Taxa named by Alwin Berger
Flora of Turkey
Flora of Armenia